Tavlebreen (The Slate Glacier) is a glacier in Nordenskiöld Land at Spitsbergen, Svalbard. The glacier is located between Sinaiberget and  Lagerlöfhøgda, flowing from Lovberget towards Passdalen. It has a length of about five kilometers.

References

Glaciers of Spitsbergen